Hebron Presbyterian Church, also known as Sutton's Branch Church, is a historic Presbyterian church and national historic district located near Beautancus, Duplin County, North Carolina. The district encompasses one contributing building and one contributing site. The church was built in 1890, and is a small one-story, front gable, wood-frame Late Gothic Revival-style church.  Also on the property is the contributing church cemetery with burials dating to 1902.

It was added to the National Register of Historic Places in 1995.

References

Churches on the National Register of Historic Places in North Carolina
Historic districts on the National Register of Historic Places in North Carolina
Gothic Revival architecture in North Carolina
Churches completed in 1890
Buildings and structures in Duplin County, North Carolina
National Register of Historic Places in Duplin County, North Carolina